Izz al-Din Husayn (Persian: عز الدین حسین) was the king of the Ghurid dynasty. He succeeded his father Qutb al-din Hasan in 1100. When Husayn ascended the Ghurid throne, his kingdom was in chaos. However, he managed to restore peace, and strengthen his kingdom. During Husayn's late reign, the Seljuq sultan Ahmad Sanjar invaded his domains, defeated him, and captured him. However, Sanjar later released Husayn in return for sending tribute to him. After Husayn's death in 1146, he was succeeded by his son Sayf al-Din Suri. Husayn also had 6 other sons who later divided the Ghurid kingdom among themselves.

References

Sources

 

12th-century Iranian people
Ghurid dynasty
1146 deaths
Year of birth unknown